Woodford Island is an inland island in the Far-North Coast of New South Wales, Australia. It is formed by the Clarence River where it splits into the South Arm and North Arm at the small village of Brushgrove then reforms at the town of Maclean. The island is the largest in NSW, either inland or offshore, at 37 km2.

Access
There are three ways on and off the island, two bridges; at the southern end is the Wingfield Bridge in Brushgrove, which crosses to Cowper, and the McFarlane Bridge at the northern end, that gives access to Maclean.

There is a ferry that connects Lawrence to Woodford Dale, being the western side of the island,

Economy
Woodford Island is mostly flood plain which supports the primary industries of sugar cane and milk producing cattle. A small fishing fleet ply the Clarence River. There are a few small businesses, however, most residents travel off the island to Maclean or Grafton for goods and services.

People and geography
There are approximately 300 people living on the island. Through its almost exact centre is a mountain ridge. The rest is plains which are subjected to periodic flooding. The largest town is Brushgrove at the south of the island. It holds major aboriginal significance in the area and the aboriginal village of Ilarwill.

History
Woodford Island was one of the first places inhabited by Europeans on the Far-North Coast. Original settler John Small was attracted to the abundance of Australian Redcedar. The town of Brushgrove was once a major trading hub for timber, sugar and other agriculture goods due to its location on the Clarence River. This brought tremendous wealth to area and at one time the island supported many schools, a police station, many businesses and other utilities. However, due to the development of road and train infrastructure, the town has dwindled in size over the past century.

Points of interests
Tourist drive 22 travels across the island starting at the Lawrence Car Ferry and ending at the McFarlane Bridge that enters Maclean. .
The bridge was named after John McFarlane local member of the New South Wales Legislative Assembly.

The island is broken up into areas being-
Woodford Dale  (The last school on the island which closed in 2011)
Woodford Leigh
Brushgrove  (Old, police station, post office, pub, shops)
Ilarwill ( aboriginal village, old quarry boat shed)
Tyndale
South arm
As well as many of property name like yakalo on the Lawrence side of the island

Maclean District Golf Course is on the island.

Hermitt Cave, 
Small's Pioneer Cemetery, 
Old Schools, 
Abandoned Quarry.
Police station.
Radio towers.
Cane fields.
And the mighty Clarence River

References

Islands of New South Wales
River islands of Australia